K-1 World Grand Prix 2004 Final was a kickboxing event promoted by the K-1 organization. It was the twelfth K-1 World Grand Prix final, involving twelve of the world's best K-1 fighters (four being reservists) from eight countries, with all bouts fought under K-1 Rules (100 kg/156-220 lbs).  The tournament qualifiers had almost all qualified via the K-1 World Grand Prix 2004 Final Elimination with the exception of Remy Bonjasky who was the reigning champion.

The tournament winner was Remy Bonjasky who won his second consecutive K-1 World Grand Prix title by defeating Musashi in the final by second extra round unanimous decision in a repeat of the previous years final.  The tournament was also notable for the inclusion of Kaoklai Kaennorsing who was the youngest (21 years) and lightest (172 lbs) competitor to ever participate in a K-1 World Grand Prix final.  During the course of the competition Kaoklai managed to get to the Semi Finals by defeating the heaviest competitor at this year's finals, Mighty Mo, who weighed in at 280 lbs.  The event was held at the Tokyo Dome in Tokyo, Japan on Saturday, December 4, 2004  in front of 64,819 spectators.

K-1 World Grand Prix 2004 Final Tournament

Results 

Reserve Fight 1: K-1 Rules / 3Min. 3R Ext. 2R
Jérôme Le Banner  vs Hiromi Amada    
Le Banner defeated Amada by KO (2 Knockdown, Left Low Kick) at 1:03 of the 2nd Round.

Quarter Finals: K-1 Rules / 3Min. 3R Ext. 1R
Kaoklai Kaennorsing  vs Mighty Mo 
Kaennorsing defeated Mo by KO (Right High Kick) at 2:40 of the 1st Round.

Ray Sefo  vs Musashi 
Musashi defeated Sefo by Extra Round Unanimous Decision 3-0 (9.5-9, 10-9.5, 10-9.5). After 3 rounds the judges had scored it a Decision Draw (28.5-29, 30-30, 29-28.5).

Peter Aerts  vs Francois Botha 
Botha defeated Aerts by KO (2 Knockdown, Leg Injury) at 1:13 of the 1st Round.

Remy Bonjasky  vs Ernesto Hoost 
Bonjasky defeated Hoost by Extra Round Unanimous Decision 3-0 (10-9.5, 10-9.5, 10-9.5). After 3 rounds the judges had scored it a Decision Draw (29-29, 30-30, 29-28.5).

Reserve Fight 2: K-1 Rules / 3Min. 3R Ext. 2R
Cyril Abidi  vs Gary Goodridge  
Goodridge defeated Abidi by KO (2 Knockdown, Right Hook) at 3:00 of the 1st Round.

Semi Finals: K-1 Rules / 3Min. 3R Ext. 1R
Kaoklai Kaennorsing  vs Musashi 
Musashi defeated Kaennorsing by Extra Round Unanimous Decision 3-0 (10-9.5, 10-9.5, 10-9.5). After 3 rounds the judges had scored it a Decision Draw (30-30, 29.5-29.5, 30-29.5).

Francois Botha  vs Remy Bonjasky 
Bonjasky defeated Botha by 3rd Round Unanimous Decision 3-0 (27.5-25.5, 28.5-27.5, 28.5-27.5).

Final: K-1 Rules / 3Min. 3R Ext. 2R
Musashi  vs Remy Bonjasky 
Bonjasky defeated Musashi by 2nd Extra Round Unanimous Decision 3-0 (10-9, 10-9.5, 10-9.5).  After 3 rounds the judges scored it a Majority Draw in favour of Bonjasky (28.5-28, 28.5-27.5, 29-29).  After the 1st Extra Round the judges scored it Majority Draw in favour of Bonjasky (9.5-9.5, 10-9.5, 9.5-9.5)

See also
List of K-1 events
List of K-1 champions
List of male kickboxers

References

External links
K-1sport.de - Your Source for Everything K-1
K-1 Official Website

K-1 events
2004 in kickboxing
Kickboxing in Japan
Sports competitions in Tokyo